Besate is a comune (municipality) in the Metropolitan City of Milan in the Italian region Lombardy, located about  southwest of Milan.

Beside borders the following municipalities: Morimondo, Vigevano, Casorate Primo and Motta Visconti.

References

External links
 Official website

Cities and towns in Lombardy